Seldon's Compendium of Starcraft 1 is a 1981 role-playing game supplement for Space Opera published by Fantasy Games Unlimited.

Contents
Seldon's Compendium of Starcraft 1 is a supplement presenting statistics plus deck plans for some 20 starships and five ship's boats, plus a pod shuttle.

Reception
William A. Barton reviewed Seldon's Compendium of Starcraft 1 in The Space Gamer No. 50. Barton commented that "Overall, Seldon's Compendium of Starcraft 1 appears to be a well-planned out aid for Space Opera and should prove quite useful to players and starmasters alike."

References

Role-playing game supplements introduced in 1981
Space Opera supplements